Marita insculpta is a species of sea snail, a marine gastropod mollusk in the family Mangeliidae.

Description
The length of the shell attains 6 mm.

The shell is closely longitudinally plicate. The ribs form a slight posterior shoulder or angle, interstices with revolving lirae. The color of the shell is light yellowish brown, darker in the grooves.

Distribution
This marine species is endemic to Australia and occurs off  South Australia and Victoria.

References

 Adams, A. & Angas, G.F. 1864. Descriptions of new species from Australian seas, in the collection of George French Angas. Proceedings of the Zoological Society of London 1863(III): 418-428, pl. xxxvii
 Verco, J.C. 1909. Notes on South Australian marine Mollusca with descriptions of new species. Part XII. Transactions of the Royal Society of South Australia 33: 293-342

External links
  Tucker, J.K. 2004 Catalog of recent and fossil turrids (Mollusca: Gastropoda). Zootaxa 682:1-1295.
  Hedley C. 1922. A revision of the Australian Turridae. Records of the Australian Museum 13(6): 213-359
 

insculpta
Gastropods described in 1864
Gastropods of Australia